Xie Sutai (November 1925 – 18 July 2010) was a Chinese translator.

She was most notable for being one of the main translators of the works of the Russian novelist Leo Tolstoy into Chinese.

Biography
Xie was born in Hebei in November 1925.

Xie was accepted to Southwest United University in 1945, where she majored in the Department of Foreign languages.

After the Chinese Civil War, Xie was transferred to Tsinghua University. After graduating in 1949, she was appointed an editor to the People's Literature Publishing House.

Xie started to publish works in 1950 and she joined the China Writers Association in 1984.

Xie died of pneumonia on July 18, 2010 at Chaoyang Hospital in Beijing.

Translations
 Anna Karenina
 Collected Works of Leo Tolstoy (Leo Tolstoy) 
 Far Away from Moscow
 The Living and the Dead
 Towarding a New Shore
 Butterfly Dream
 The Moonstone
 Childhood, Juvenile, and Youth
 Free Air
 The Wilderness Hotel
 At 79 Park Avenue
 Cosette
  Villette (Charlotte Brontë)

Awards
 Chinese Translation Association – Competent Translator (2004)

References

1925 births
2010 deaths
Writers from Hebei
Peking University alumni
National Southwestern Associated University alumni
People's Republic of China translators
Russian–Chinese translators
20th-century Chinese translators
21st-century Chinese translators